This is a list of Brazilian television related events from 1967.

Events

Debuts

Television shows

Births
28 March - Sérgio Loroza, actor & singer-songwriter
7 September - Toni Garrido, actor, singer-songwriter & TV host

Deaths

See also
1967 in Brazil